Tungi (earlier names Tunga (apex), or Tungiya (as versed in Jain texts)] is a village in Nalanda district in Bihar, India.

Notability
According to Jain Agamas, Tungi could be the place  where Mahavir established his superiority over Parshvanth followers and then became 24th Tirthankar. Shiva Purana also describes about the Baba Bileshvaranath Shivalinga temple near the pond here. The statues of deities are dated back to the times of Buddha.

The village is predominantly populated by Rajputs, Kurmi & other Hindus. On the occasion of Maha Shivaratri, villagers altogether conduct a puja being performed at the temple.  The next day there is a fair organised every year.

Tungi is a large village located in Bihar Block of Nalanda district, Bihar with total 1002 families residing. The Tungi village has population of 5905 of which 3115 are males while 2790 are females as per Population Census 2011.

In Tungi village population of children with age 0-6 is 1049 which makes up 17.76 % of total population of village. Average Sex Ratio of Tungi village is 896 which is lower than Bihar state average of 918. Child Sex Ratio for the Tungi as per census is 939, higher than Bihar average of 935.

Tungi village has higher literacy rate compared to Bihar. In 2011, literacy rate of Tungi village was 64.29 % compared to 61.80 % of Bihar. In Tungi Male literacy stands at 74.09 % while female literacy rate was 53.24 %.

As per constitution of India and Panchyati Raaj Act, Tungi village is administrated by Sarpanch (Head of Village) who is elected representative of village. Our website, don't have information about schools and hospital in Tungi village.

Villages in Nalanda district